Tristán Marof (born Gustavo Adolfo Navarro in Sucre, Bolivia, 1898; died Santa Cruz de la Sierra, Bolivia, 1979) was a Bolivian diplomat, writer, essayist, and journalist. He was Consul of Bolivia in Europe, where he was linked to the labor movement and Marxist-Leninist organizations.

The Socialist Workers' Party of Bolivia was established on 1 January 1940, by Marof, then leader of the Confederation of Bolivian Workers (CSTB), after he was expelled from the Revolutionary Workers' Party in 1938.

Early years

Marof was born in Sucre into a modest family. At a young age he became interested in politics and social issues. At 17 he published the short-lived magazine Renacimiento Altoperuano (Renaissance Upper Peru). He later wrote for the newspaper El Hombre Libre (Freeman) and was positioned as an opponent of the Liberal Party (Bolivia) that dominated the Bolivian political spectrum of the early twentieth century.

Republicanism

From 1920 it became part of the heterogeneous Republican Party, following the line of Bautista Saavedra. That year a military coup deposed the liberal president José Gutiérrez Guerra and installed a junta under the leadership of Saavedra, who was later elected president. Marof's active participation during the revolt, including administration of the prison La Paz during the coup, earned him a nomination for the post of consul in Le Havre, France.

Marof in Europe

During the years he spent in France, Navarro gradually leaned towards communism and Marxism. Contacted thinkers, politicians and writers of these trends, as Henri Barbusse, who wrote prefaces to his works and inserted it into French leftist circles. During this time he also began to form in works such as The Americas naive o justice of the Inca, the Inca system idealized conception, to which he attributes the like communism. It is in France that takes the pseudonym Tristan Marof, publishing The naive American continent. His position was quickly consul committed his radical communist thought, so resigned, but remained in Europe until 1926.

Exile

Back in Bolivia, Marof quickly began contacting local politicians to organize a Marxist socialist movement. In 1927, he organized, with Roberto Hinojosa, what they called the Maximum Socialist Party. He ran for Congress for Sucre with this acronym, but the government denounced a Communist coup planned by Marof and his organization, and he had to go into exile in Argentina.

His life in exile was mainly traveling, through Panama, Mexico, Peru and Cuba among other countries, for nearly 10 years. During this time he published some of his most influential works, including Wall Street and Hunger (Wall Street y hambre) and Mexico to the Front and Side (México de frente y de perfil), which also created controversy over criticism of the Mexican Revolution. The same Mexican government expelled him, accusing him of subversion.

The many contacts and links that Marof developed in exile, including the likes of José Carlos Mariátegui or Víctor Raúl Haya de la Torre, and his constant activism gave him some notoriety in groups and progressive circles of the Latin American left. This was also some controversy with the Communist International, and the diplomacy of the Soviet Union. The exile of Leon Trotsky and the apparent support by Marof for it, were some of the causes of these differences.

While in Argentina, Marof founded the group "Túpac Amaru", a Marxist and pacifist power, contrary to belligerence in the nascent Chaco conflict. This group merged with other fronts of the Bolivian left, including the Bolivian left in Chile and "Exiles in Peru", to form the Revolutionary Workers' Party (POR) in 1935. Among the early leaders of this party were Marof, José Aguirre Gainsbourg, Alipio Valencia and Eduardo Arze.

Work

His work has been characterized by critics permanent Bolivian society and political structures. His first novel, The Civic, has a strong political support Bautista Saavedra .
For the depth of its analysis and interpretation of the reality of Bolivia is compared by many with the Peruvian author José Carlos Mariátegui. The best known works are Marof Tristan: "Justice del Inca", published in Belgium, "Essays and Criticism: Revolutions Bolivian international wars and Writers", "Wall Street and Hunger", published in 1927, "The Tragedy of the Altiplano "" Truth in Bolivia socialist "," The danger Nazi in Bolivia "," The Oath "," Mexico from the front and side, "among others. While in Cordoba , Argentina , wrote: "Banished from my country since 1927, three successive governments refused me entry into Bolivia. I was sentenced to six years in prison for attempted military rebellion. processed without hearing me, I refused nationality , slandered me and tried to ruin me, prosecute me again, this time condemning me to death, asked the Argentine government to persecute me in their territory and deny me their hospitality. "
He was critical of the Chaco War that pitted Bolivia and Paraguay, who sacrificed in an absurd war thousands of indigenous Guarani who lived hundreds of years as sister nations. In direct language Tristan Marof held that "a powerful company, holds more than four million and a half of oil lands, pushed for that purpose (the war). Inept and treacherous in their own country, the miserable bourgeoisie threw himself into the arms of financial capital. Following the war the business was already solved: for heroes medals, ribbons, speeches and hunger for lawyers, businessmen, politicians and Bolivians arrastrasen at the foot of the imperialists in the invidious office of pimps in their own country, perks and jobs. Thus the rear and the generals have been rewarded. "
Until 1967 published Marof Tristan valuable comments on the authors and the history of Bolivia and on international politics. He wrote his autobiography under the title: "The novel of a man." His reflections, as he wrote in his introduction to "Essays and Criticism" are still generating debate: "This is the national default and national evil; lack of maturity and balance, emotional depth and emotional as unfair and pessimistic. Bolivians any latitude, whether the Andes and the valley and the tropics , believe their misfortunes are the result of fortune and luck, not giving any value to the idea and the brain. therefore are elements of disorder and no social scales or distinctions: all are emotional and therefore unjust. Here in these highlands, arose in a culture very old times in the eastern plains and a promise. Though loathe both, are completed. Someone eventually destroyed, both be destroyed to make way for the unit, they are prosperous and rich. Bolivia That is the future. "

Other works
 The civics, 1919
 Suetonio Pimienta, novel, 1924
 The Experiment, 1947
 The Illustrious City, novel, 1950
 Essays and Criticism. Bolivian Revolutions, International Wars and Writers, 1961.

Notes

↑ Baciu, 1987, p. 227
↑ Alexander, 1991, p. 117
↑ Schelchkov, 2009, p. 3
↑ Mesa Gisbert, 2004, p. 137
↑ Schelchkov, 2009, p. 4
↑ Schelchkov, 2009, p. 5
↑ Schelchkov, 2009, p. 5
↑ Schelchkov, 2009, p. 5
↑ Sándor John, 2009, p. 38
↑ Schelchkov, 2009, p. 4
↑ Schelchkov, 2009, p. 10
↑ Sándor John, 2009, p. 49
↑ Schelchkov, 2009, p. 4
↑ Marof, 1961, p. 8

References

Bolivian male writers
Bolivian journalists
Male journalists
Bolivian essayists
Bolivian diplomats
1898 births
1979 deaths
People from Sucre
Bolivian socialists
20th-century essayists
20th-century journalists